The New Zealand Telecommunications Forum (TCF) is a pan-industry organisation which aims to encourage cooperation and develop standards for telecommunications equipment and services.

Its members include 2degrees, Chorus, Spark New Zealand, Vodafone New Zealand as well as a significant number of smaller players in the New Zealand telecommunications industry.

The TCF is recognised by the government as being the "Telecommunications Industry Forum" referred to in the Telecommunications Act 2001.

The current CEO, Paul Brislen, was appointed in July 2021, and succeeded Geoff Thorne.

Work programmes

In December 2013, the TCF launched a stolen mobile phone blacklisting system with the backing of Telecom, Vodafone and 2degrees.

References

External links

Telecommunications in New Zealand
2002 establishments in New Zealand